In plant biology, the hyponastic response is a nastic movement characterized by an upward bending of leaves or other plant parts, resulting from accelerated growth of the lower side of the petiole in comparison to its upper part. This can be observed in many terrestrial plants and is linked to the plant hormone ethylene.
The plant’s root senses the water excess and produces 1-Aminocyclopropane-1-carboxylic acid which then is converted into ethylene, regulating this process.

Submerged plants often show the hyponastic response, where the upward bending of the leaves and the elongation of the petioles might help the plant to restore normal gas exchange with the atmosphere.

Plants that are exposed to elevated ethylene levels in experimental set-ups also show the hyponastic response.

References

Plant physiology
Botany